Amado M. Padilla (born October 19, 1942) is an educator known for his research on academic resiliency, acculturation and related stress, second language learning and bilingualism. Padilla is Professor of Psychological Studies in Education and Associate Dean at the Stanford Graduate School of Education.

Biography 
Padilla was born in Albuquerque, New Mexico on October 19, 1942. He went to New Mexico Highlands University and completed his bachelor's degree in Psychology in1964. Padilla received his master's degree in Experimental Psychology at Oklahoma State University in 1966. and his Ph.D. in Experimental Psychology at the University of New Mexico in 1969. His dissertation titled "An analysis of incentive and behavioral contrast" was supervised by Frank A. Logan.

Padilla taught at the State University of New York, college at Potsdam from 1969 to 1971 and at the University of California, Santa Barbara from 1971 to 1974. From 1974 to 1988, Padilla was faculty at University of California in Los Angeles. After spending 1986-1987 as a visiting professor at Stanford University, he joined the Stanford faculty as Professor of Psychological Studies in Education in 1988. Padilla is affiliated with Stanford's Center for Latin American Studies.

Padilla is the founding editor of the Hispanic Journal of Behavioral Sciences.

Padilla is known for his work highlighting critical issues that affect the well-being of Hispanics in education and other settings.  He is credited with coining the term cultural taxation to describe the increased workload and other "unique burdens that faculty of color and other underrepresented faculty face in carrying out responsibilities" at many universities.

Awards 

 Academic Excellence Award from the National Coalition of Hispanic Mental Health and Human Services Organizations (1978)
 Distinguished Scholar Award from the Standing Committee on the Role and Status of Minorities in Education Research and Development, American Education Research Association (1987)
 Distinguished Research Award from the Hispanic Research Issues, Special Interest Group, American Education Research Association (1988)
 Distinguished Contribution through Research Award, Division 45, American Psychological Association (1990)
 Lifetime Achievement Award, Division 45, American Psychological Association (1996)

Books 

 Keefe, S. E., & Padilla, A. M. (1987). Chicano ethnicity. University of New Mexico Press.
 Padilla, A. M. (1976). Bilingual schools: Gateways to integration or roads to separation. Spanish Speaking Mental Health Research Center
 Padilla, A. M. (Ed.). (1980). Acculturation: Theory, models, and some new findings (Vol. 39). Westview Press.
 Padilla, A. M. (Ed.). (1994). Hispanic psychology: Critical issues in theory and research. Sage Publications
 Padilla, A. M., Fairchild, H. H., & Valadez, C. M. (Eds.). (1990). Foreign language education: Issues and strategies. Corwin.
 Padilla, A. M., & Ruiz, R. A. (1974). Latino mental health: A review of literature. National Institute of Mental Health.

Representative publications

References

External links 

 Faculty page at Stanford University
 Amado M. Padilla publications indexed by Google Scholar

21st-century American psychologists
Educational psychology
Stanford University faculty
New Mexico Highlands University alumni
Oklahoma State University alumni
University of New Mexico alumni
Hispanic and Latino American academics
1942 births
Bilingualism
Living people
20th-century American psychologists